Marco Bleve (born 18 October 1995) is an Italian professional footballer who plays as a goalkeeper for  club Lecce.

Club career
He made his Serie C debut for Lecce on 22 September 2013 in a game against Catanzaro.

On 25 January 2020, he joined Catanzaro on loan for the remainder of the 2019–20 season.

References

External links
 

Living people
1995 births
Sportspeople from the Province of Lecce
Italian footballers
Footballers from Apulia
Association football goalkeepers
Serie B players
Serie C players
U.S. Lecce players
A.S. Martina Franca 1947 players
Ternana Calcio players
U.S. Catanzaro 1929 players
21st-century Italian people